Bolek and Lolek are two Polish cartoon characters from the children's animated comedy television series by the same name. They were created by Władysław Nehrebecki the author, scriptwriter and main director and partially designed by Władysław Nehrebecki, Alfred Ledwig and Leszek Lorek.  The series is about two brothers and their fun (and sometimes silly) adventures which often involve spending a lot of time outdoors.

History and background
The characters were first introduced in an animated film in 1962. Their names are diminutives of Bolesław and Karol. In English, the cartoon was distributed as Benny & Lenny, Jym and Jam and Tim & Tom. In 1973, at the requests from female viewers, a girl character by the name of Tola was added; she lives in the forest and meets the brothers there. Her first appearance was in the episode "Tola". In total, Tola appeared in 30 episodes.

In a similar vein to The Pink Panther theatrical cartoons, most episodes do not have dialogue. Exceptions are feature-length films and the series from the 1980s, where the main characters' voices were done by: Bolek – Ewa Złotowska, Ilona Kuśmierska; Lolek – Danuta Mancewicz, Danuta Przesmycka.

During the period of the Polish People's Republic, Bolek and Lolek were reproduced in a large quantity of toys: action figures, movies, postcards, online arcades, puzzles, etc., which can be seen in the Museum of Dobranocki (bed-time stories) of the PRL. They are also currently made in computer programmes, colouring books, general picture books and games.

The series was popular in many countries, and was one of the few animated films allowed to be broadcast by Iranian television, along with other popular Polish animated cartoon Reksio, just after the Iranian Revolution of 1979.

In 2011, a monument of Bolek and Lolek was erected in Bielsko-Biała.

Characters
 Bolek (voiced by Ewa Złotowska and Ilona Kuśmierska) - Lolek's big brother.
 Lolek (voiced by Danuta Mancewicz and Danuta Przesmycka) - Bolek's little brother.
 Tola - An ordinary girl who lives deep in the forest and has red hair in pigtails. She wears a white shirt, a blue jumper, white socks and black shoes. In her first appearance in the episode "Tola", Tola is leaving the forest and moved to Bolek and Lolek's house and met them for the first time. According to the episode "Zgubiony Ślad", Tola lives in the wooden cottage in the forest. She is a supporting character in the series.

Telecast and home release
In the U.S., some episodes were seen as part of Nickelodeon's Pinwheel from 1977 to 1990, In Canada, the show reruns on the French-speaking TVJQ (now Vrak) in the 1980s. For several years, it released videotapes and DVDs. In Catalonia, it was aired in Catalan in 1990.

Television series

1. Bolek i Lolek
Bolek and Lolek - 13 Episodes, 1962–1964.

2. Bolek i Lolek na wakacjach
Benny and Lenny on Vacation - 13 episodes, 1965–1966.

3. Bolek i Lolek wyruszają w świat
Benny and Lenny travel the world - 18 episodes, 1968–1970.

4. Bajki Bolka i Lolka
The Tales of Bolek and Lolek - 13 episodes, 1970–1971.

5. Bolek i Lolek na Dzikim Zachodzie
Benny and Lenny in the Wild West - 7 episodes, 1972.

6. Przygody Bolka i Lolka
The Adventures of Bolek and Lolek - 63 episodes, 1972–1980.

7. Zabawy Bolka i Lolka
Fun with Bolek and Lolek - 7 episodes, 1975–1976.

8. Wielka podróż Bolka i Lolka
Bolek and Lolek's Great Journey - 15 episodes, 1978.

9. Bolek i Lolek wśród górników
Benny and Lenny Among the Miners - 7 episodes, 1980.

10. Olimpiada Bolka i Lolka
Olympics with Bolek and Lolek - 13 episodes, 1983–1984.

11. Bolek i Lolek w Europie
Benny and Lenny in Europe - 5 episodes, 1983–1986.

Films

Feature films
 Wielka podróż Bolka i Lolka – Bolek and Lolek's Great Journey (adapted into the 15-episode series of the same name) – 16 September 1977
 Kawaler Orderu Uśmiechu – The Knight of the Order of the Smile (sequel to "Great Journey") – 1979

Episodes edited into films
 Bolek i Lolek na Dzikim Zachodzie (Bolek and Lolek in the Wild West) – 5 December 1986
 Sposób na wakacje Bolka i Lolka (How Bolek and Lolek Do Vacations) – 1986
 Bajki Bolka i Lolka (Tales of Bolek and Lolek) – 1986

Educational films

See also 
 Siegessäule (magazine)#Controversy

References

External links

Television characters introduced in 1962
Copyright infringement
Polish children's animated adventure television series
Polish children's animated comedy television series
Animated duos
Television duos
Fictional Polish people
1962 Polish television series debuts
1986 Polish television series endings
1960s Polish television series
1970s Polish television series
1980s Polish television series
1960s animated television series
1970s animated television series
1980s animated television series
Telewizja Polska original programming
Animated television series about brothers
Animated television series about children
Child characters in television
Male characters in animated series
Female characters in animated series